Sebhat Ephrem (Tigrinya: ስብሓት ኤፍረም; born 1951 in Bardae, Eritrea) is the Minister of Energy and Mines for Eritrea, a former Minister of Defence and former Eritrean People's Liberation Front commander during the Eritrean War of Independence.

Sebhat completed high school at the Luel Mekonnen High School in Asmara and his elementary school at Evangelical School in Asmara, Eritrea. He later attended Addis Ababa University for two years before joining the EPLF in 1972. As a fighter, he quickly rose up the ranks from a political commissar  to becoming part of the executive committee. Sebhat Ephrem served from June 1992 to March 1994 as the Governor of Asmara. From March 1994 to May 1995 he served as the Minister of Health. In both positions he brought structure and reorganization to these offices. After leaving the military in June 1992, he returned to the army in May 1995 with the rank of general and was appointed and confirmed as Minister of Defense. It is believed that in 1998 he was the only 4-star general in the Eritrean defence forces. In 2019, Sebhat was subject to an assassination attempt that left him in critical condition, from which he later recovered.

References

Eritrean soldiers
Living people
1951 births
People's Front for Democracy and Justice politicians
Government ministers of Eritrea
Eritrean People's Liberation Front members
People of the Ethiopian Civil War